In enzymology, a phloroisovalerophenone synthase is an enzyme that catalyzes the chemical reaction

isovaleryl-CoA + 3 malonyl-CoA  4 CoASH + 3 CO2 + 3-methyl-1-(2,4,6-trihydroxyphenyl)butan-1-one

Thus, the two substrates of this enzyme are isovaleryl-CoA and malonyl-CoA, whereas its 3 products are CoASH, CO2, and 3-methyl-1-(2,4,6-trihydroxyphenyl)butan-1-one.

This enzyme belongs to the family of transferases, specifically those acyltransferases transferring groups other than aminoacyl groups.  The systematic name of this enzyme class is isovaleryl-CoA:malonyl-CoA acyltransferase. Other names in common use include valerophenone synthase, and 3-methyl-1-(trihydroxyphenyl)butan-1-one synthase.

References 

 
 

EC 2.3.1
Enzymes of unknown structure